Menai High School is a secondary school located in Illawong, a suburb in Sydney's Sutherland Shire, New South Wales, Australia.

History 
Menai High School was opened in February 1988. Don Harwin was the first principal; after he retired in 1997, Edith McNally took over. She retired in 2015, and was succeeded by Barney Ellevsen.

Curriculum
Menai High school has a successful sporting background, with many teams participating in regional competitions. Other extracurricular activities supported by the school include an agricultural farm, debating, drama and music.

The school has also participated in cultural celebration events, such as in 2006, when the Beverly Hills Intensive English centre visited Menai High School. As part of a cultural exchange program, the event, with performing arts exchanges and food stalls, ultimately aimed at addressing racism and tolerance.

Notable alumni 
Erin Bell –  netball player for the Adelaide Thunderbirds
Tom Glover – goalkeeper for Melbourne City FC and Australia national under-23 soccer team
Amanda Harrison – award-winning musical theatre actress. She has performed across Australia and in the West End, and is currently playing Elphaba in the Australian production of the musical Wicked, a role that she originated.
Blake Powell – a footballer for Sydney FC 
Steve Smith – Australian international cricketer and former captain of the Australian national cricket team.
Robert Whittaker - UFC Middleweight World Champion

See also 
 List of Government schools in New South Wales

References

External links
 Menai High School website

Sutherland Shire
Public high schools in Sydney
1988 establishments in Australia
Educational institutions established in 1988